Tenkiller is an unincorporated community and census-designated place (CDP) in Cherokee County, Oklahoma, United States. The population was 633 at the 2010 census.

Geography
Tenkiller is located in southeastern Cherokee County at  (35.792006, -94.874398). It is bordered to the north by Welling, to the west across the Illinois River by Park Hill and Keys, and to the east by Rocky Mountain in Adair County. The community of Dry Creek is a short distance to the south.

Tenkiller Ferry Lake on the Illinois River occupies the western border of the CDP.

Demographics

As of the census of 2000, there were 549 people, 198 households, and 155 families residing in the CDP. The population density was 28.9 people per square mile (11.2/km2). There were 230 housing units at an average density of 12.1/sq mi (4.7/km2). The racial makeup of the CDP was 49.18% White, 1.82% African American, 38.43% Native American, 0.36% from other races, and 10.20% from two or more races. Hispanic or Latino of any race were 1.09% of the population.

There were 198 households, out of which 36.4% had children under the age of 18 living with them, 60.1% were married couples living together, 13.1% had a female householder with no husband present, and 21.7% were non-families. 18.7% of all households were made up of individuals, and 7.6% had someone living alone who was 65 years of age or older. The average household size was 2.77 and the average family size was 3.09.

In the CDP, the population was spread out, with 30.1% under the age of 18, 5.1% from 18 to 24, 29.1% from 25 to 44, 23.7% from 45 to 64, and 12.0% who were 65 years of age or older. The median age was 37 years. For every 100 females, there were 108.7 males. For every 100 females age 18 and over, there were 105.3 males.

The median income for a household in the CDP was $24,712, and the median income for a family was $26,618. Males had a median income of $21,250 versus $26,750 for females. The per capita income for the CDP was $12,366. About 11.4% of families and 21.0% of the population were below the poverty line, including 36.4% of those under age 18 and 6.1% of those age 65 or over.

References

Census-designated places in Cherokee County, Oklahoma
Census-designated places in Oklahoma